Will Ray (born 1950 in Richmond, Virginia) is an American session guitarist and current member of the Hellecasters.  Ray has also released a number of solo albums.  He is considered an influential player of the Fender Telecaster line of guitars. Fender made two Will Ray signature models in the late 1990s: the Jazz-a-Caster and the Mojo-Tele. G&L is now offering a Will Ray signature model guitar and a less expensive version within their lower cost brand, Tribute by G&L.

In July 2005, Ray moved to North Carolina where he built a new state of the art recording studio for production projects.

In September 2009, Ray began hosting a weekly music jam in Fletcher, North Carolina at The Feed and Seed.
The Tuesday night "Will Ray Mountain Jam" encourages local musicians, singer/songwriters to sign up and play with the house band (Will Ray and The Son's of Ralph).

References

External links

1950 births
Living people
20th-century American guitarists
20th-century American male musicians
American male guitarists
American rock guitarists
American session musicians
The Hellecasters members